Matthew Tolmach (born 1964) is an American film producer and former co-president of production at Sony Pictures Entertainment.

Biography
Tolmach first became interested in film after hearing stories from his grandfather, producer and film executive Sam Jaffe. He is of Jewish descent. After moving to Los Angeles, he landed a job with Frank Marshall to make a documentary about Lance Armstrong that was directed by Alex Gibney. In 2008, he was named co-president of production at Sony Pictures Entertainment with Doug Belgrad (whom he had been working with since 2003) where he managed the Spider-Man franchise. In 2010, he left Sony Pictures Entertainment to produce the next installment of Spider-Man. Belgrad was named as sole president of the studio and Hanna Minghella was named president of production.

Personal life
Tolmach is married to director Paige Goldberg. They have one child.

Filmography

References

American film producers
1964 births
20th-century American Jews
Living people
Beloit College alumni
Jaffe family
21st-century American Jews
Jewish American film producers